Passavant may refer to:

People 
Fanny Passavant (1849-1944), English librarian
 Johann David Passavant (1787–1861), German painter, curator and artist
 William Passavant (1821–1894), American Lutheran minister

French communes 
 Passavant, Doubs
 Passavant-en-Argonne, Marne
 Passavant-la-Rochère, Haute-Saône
 Passavant-sur-Layon, Maine-et-Loire

Hospitals 
 Passavant Area Hospital, a hospital in Jacksonville, Illinois
 Passavant Memorial Hospital, a hospital in Chicago, Illinois
 UPMC Passavant, a hospital within University of Pittsburgh Medical Center located in Pittsburgh, Pennsylvania

Other uses 
 Barony of Passavant, in Frankish Greece